Lamponega is a genus of Australian white tailed spiders that was first described by Norman I. Platnick in 2000.  it contains only three species: L. arcoona, L. forceps, and L. serpentine.

See also
 List of Lamponidae species

References

Araneomorphae genera
Lamponidae
Spiders of Australia